Otavia antiqua is an early sponge-like fossil found in Namibia in the Etosha National Park. It is claimed to be the oldest animal fossil, being found in rock aged between 760 and 550 million years ago. The genus was named after the Otavi Group in Namibia in which the fossils were found. The oldest fossils are from the Tonian period, before the Cryogenian glaciations, but the latest found were from the Nama Group rocks, which are from the Ediacaran period.

The shape of the fossils is irregular but rounded. They are hollow inside, and have many small, osculum-like holes connecting the interior to the outside. The material of the outer wall is predominantly calcium phosphate.

The affinities of these fossils, along with other paleontological evidence for precambrian sponges, are disputed.

See also 
 Huainan biota

References

Further reading
 
 

Ediacaran life
Cryogenian life
Precambrian sponges
Prehistoric sponge genera
Precambrian Africa
Fossils of Namibia
Fossil taxa described in 2012